Thornley, County Durham may refer to:

 Thornley, Durham, near Durham
 Thornley, Weardale, in Weardale